The Adjutant General of Massachusetts is the highest-ranking military official in the Commonwealth of Massachusetts and is subordinate to the Governor of Massachusetts. The Adjutant General is a member of the Governor's Cabinet and advises the Governor on military and emergency management matters.

Duties
The Adjutant General is the principal military advisor to the Governor and is also responsible for the organization, training and supervision of the Massachusetts National Guard and the Massachusetts State Defense Force.

List of Adjutants General of the Commonwealth of Massachusetts

References

See also
  Massachusetts National Guard

Government of Massachusetts